Exochomus is a genus of beetle of the family Coccinellidae.

Species
Exochomus aethiops (Bland, 1864)
Exochomus bellus (Wollaston, 1864)
Exochomus californicus (Casey, 1899)
Exochomus childreni (Mulsant, 1850)
Exochomus fasciatus (Casey, 1899)
Exochomus marginipennis (LeConte, 1824)
Exochomus metallicus (Korschefsky, 1935)
Exochomus nigripennis (Erichson, 1843)
Exochomus nigromaculatus (Goeze, 1777) syn. E. flavipes
Exochomus quadripustulatus (Linnaeus, 1758) Also called Brumus quadripustulatus.
Exochomus subrotundus (Casey, 1899)
Exochomus townsendi (Casey, 1908)

References
 Biolib
 Discover Life

Coccinellidae genera
Taxa named by Ludwig Redtenbacher